GSG 9 (Grenzschutzgruppe 9, literally Border Guard Group 9) is a German TV series about the special unit GSG 9 der Bundespolizei of the German Federal Police. It premiered in the spring of 2007.

Its original title, GSG 9 - Ihr Einsatz ist ihr Leben, is a pun on the word Einsatz. Einsatz can be translated as "mission, stake, bet, dedication", depending on the context. Thus, it can be translated as, GSG 9 - Their Mission Is Their Life or GSG 9 - They Put Their Lives at Stake.

Plot summary

The series revolves about the members of a fictional GSG 9 unit summoned by the Federal Police to conduct operations where the regular police cannot handle such as terrorism, hijacking and kidnapping. The unit is also deployed abroad to countries like Belarus to assist state security forces in rescuing German nationals/retake German diplomatic buildings.

Main cast
 Geb Schurlau (Marc Ben Puch)
 Demir Azlan (Bülent Sharif)
 Konny von Brendorp (Andreas Pietschmann)
 Caspar Reindl (Bert Böhlitz)
 Frank Wernitz (Jorres Risse)
 Thomas Anhoff (André Hennicke)
 Petra Helmholtz (Florentine Lahme)

Broadcasting
The series's first season aired from March 8, 2007 to May 30, 2007 on Sat.1, on Wednesdays at 8:15 PM. The second season premiered in the Spring of 2008 and comprised twelve episodes.

It premièred in Italy on March 24, 2008, and was aired from Monday to Friday at 18.40 on Steel and airs in Spain as GSG 9: Cuerpo de Élite by Calle 13. The show is also aired in Japan on WOWOW; in Brazil, as Equipe Especial 9 (Special Team 9), on A&E Mundo; and in Latin America, as Unidad Especial 9 (Special Unit 9), on A&E.

Ratings
Seasonal Ratings of GSG 9.

References

External links
 Official Site 
 

German action television series
German crime television series
2000s German police procedural television series
German drama television series
2007 German television series debuts
2008 German television series endings
German-language television shows
GSG 9
Sat.1 original programming